United Christian College (Kowloon East) is a private Christian secondary school in Kwun Tong District, Hong Kong. Established in 2003, the school is located in New Clear Water Bay Road, Kowloon, Hong Kong. English is used as the main language of instruction.

The school also provides church life to students and parents. United Christian Community Church (UCCC) was established by the school chaplain and the school principal in October 2004 for the purpose.

The school building is near New Clear Water Bay Road. The construction of a new extension building project would start from October 2007 to provide a hostel, swimming pool, multi-purpose rooms, lecture theatre, chapel, canteen, etc. to all teachers and students. The dormitory was built for foreign exchange students and also S.1 students to live.

Core values 
 God as the centre
 Integrity
 Academic Excellence
 Caring Community

Notable alumni
 Joshua Wong, Scholarism convener
 Ivan Lam, Scholarism convener

References

External links
 School website
 School Campus TV Website

Protestant secondary schools in Hong Kong
Educational institutions established in 2003
Nondenominational Christian schools in Hong Kong
2003 establishments in Hong Kong
Kwun Tong District
Boarding schools in Hong Kong